Morchella prava is a species of fungus in the family Morchellaceae described as new to science in 2012. It is found in the range 43–50°N across North America, where it fruits from April to June.

References

External links

prava
Edible fungi
Fungi described in 2012
Fungi of North America